Akysis is the largest genus of catfishes (order Siluriformes) of the family Akysidae.

Taxonomy
In 1996, it was determined that Akysis is the sister group to all other akysids, then only including Parakysis, Acrochordonichthys, and Breitensteinia. However, it was acknowledged that the genus Akysis was poorly-sampled at the time and may be deemed non-monophyletic in the future.

In 1998, it was recognized that the large genus Akysis includes two species groups. The first species group was the Akysis variegatus group, for species more closely related to the type species; the other group was the pseudobagarius group for species more closely related to the formerly-named Akysis pseudobagarius; the authors recognized it as conceivable that the groups represented two genera, but tentatively retained the species in a single genus. Since then, the genus Pseudobagarius was erected for this species group, leaving only members of the A. variegatus group in the genus Akysis.

In 2007, Laguvia manipurensis was redescribed to the genus Akysis as part of the A. variegatus group.

Distribution
These fish are found in fast-flowing streams in Southeast Asia. This area is bordered by the Irrawaddy River drainage to the west, the Barito River drainage to the east, the Lancangjiang (upper Mekong) drainage to the north, and the Citarum River drainage to the south. Akysis have been reported from Java, Sumatra, Borneo, Tenasserim, Thailand, Myanmar, and, most recently, the distribution of Akysis has been discovered to include India.

Description
These small catfish can be distinguished by their general colouring of yellow markings on a brown background. Fishes of the genus Akysis are diagnosed by having tough leathery skin covered with tubercles which are arranged in longitudinal rows along the sides, the anterior margin of the pectoral spine with a notch visible dorsally, the nasals with expansions beyond the canal-bearing teeth, and no palatal teeth. These fish are distinguished from the members of the genus Pseudobagarius by a number of characteristics: these species have a terminal mouth; the posterior and anterior nostrils being smaller and located further apart with a distance between the base of the nasal barbel and anterior nostril; the anterior nostrils are situated at the tip of a short tube; and the caudal fin is truncate or emarginate rather that forked.

The maximum adult size of Akysis species is less than 70 millimetres (2.8 in) SL.

Ecology
Catfishes of the genus Akysis are small cryptically-coloured species. Akysis are small secretive fishes that occupy a variety of habitats. Most species typically inhabit clear swift-flowing upland streams with sandy or rocky substrates. Some species are reported from the muddy side and main channels and deltas of large rivers. In smaller streams they may be found hiding in leaf litter and woody debris, in patches of live vegetation such as Cryptocoryne affinis, or in shallow riffle areas under coarse gravel or larger stones. Species of Akysis also are reported from the shallow margins to the bottom depths of large rivers where they are usually taken in trawls together with decaying vegetation.

Species
There are currently 24 recognized species in this genus:
 Akysis bilustris Ng, 2011
 Akysis brachybarbatus Chen, 1981
 Akysis clavulus Ng & Freyhof, 2003
 Akysis clinatus Ng & Rainboth, 2005
 Akysis ephippifer Ng & Kottelat, 1998
 Akysis fontaneus Ng, 2009
 Akysis fuliginatus Ng & Rainboth, 2005
 Akysis galeatus Page, Rachmatika & Robins, 2007
 Akysis hendricksoni Alfred, 1966
 Akysis heterurus Ng, 1996
 Akysis longifilis Ng, 2006
 Akysis maculipinnis Fowler, 1934
 Akysis manipurensis (Arunkumar, 2000)
 Akysis microps Ng & Tan, 1999
 Akysis pictus Günther, 1883 (Burmese stream catfish)
 Akysis portellus Ng, 2009
 Akysis prashadi Hora, 1936 (Indawgyi stream catfish)
 Akysis pulvinatus Ng, 2007
 Akysis recavus Ng & Kottelat, 1998
 Akysis scorteus Page, Hadiaty & López, 2007
 Akysis variegatus (Bleeker, 1846)
 Akysis varius Ng & Kottelat, 1998
 Akysis vespa Ng & Kottelat, 2004
 Akysis vespertinus Ng, 2008

References

Akysidae
Fish of Southeast Asia
Fish of Myanmar
Freshwater fish of China
Fish of Cambodia
Freshwater fish of India
Freshwater fish of Indonesia
Fish of Laos
Freshwater fish of Malaysia
Fish of Thailand
Fish of Vietnam
Catfish genera
Taxa named by Pieter Bleeker
Freshwater fish genera